Monobolodes prunaria is a species of moth of the family Uraniidae first described by Frederic Moore in 1887. It is found in Sri Lanka, India, Taiwan, Hong Kong, Korea, Japan (Honshu, Shikoku, Kyushu, the Ryukyu Islands) and possibly Borneo.

Description
The wingspan is about 16–20 mm. The forewings are dark greyish brown, with dark-brown striations and a round apex. The antemedial and postmedial lines are dark brown, forming a broad dark brown band constricted medially. There is a dark brown triangular spot at the middle of the posterior margin. The hindwings are dark greyish brown, suffused with dark brown scales.

The larvae feed on Gardenia species, including Gardenia jasminoides. They are pale grey with rows of black spots and a broad dorsolateral longitudinal black band over the abdominal segments.

References

Moths described in 1887
Uraniidae